Plutonomy (a portmanteau of plutocracy and economy) is the science of production and distribution of wealth.

Origins 

Plutonomy entered the language as late as the 1850s in the work of John Malcolm Forbes Ludlow. John Ruskin is quoted as having referred to plutonomy as a "base or bastard science". 

 Citigroup analysts have also used the word plutonomy to describe economies "where economic growth is powered by and largely consumed by the wealthy few."  In three reports for super-rich Citigroup clients published in 2005 and 2006, a team of Citigroup analysts elaborated on their thesis that the share of the very rich in national income of plutonomies had become so large that what is going on in these economies and in their relation with other economies cannot be properly understood any more with reference to the average consumer: "The rich are so rich that their behavior – be it negative savings, or just very low consumption of oil as a % of their income – overwhelms that of the 'average' consumer."

The authors of these studies predicted that the global trend toward plutonomies would continue, for various reasons, including "capitalist-friendly governments and tax regimes". They do, however, also warn of the risk that, since "political enfranchisement remains as was – one person, one vote, at some point it is likely that labor will fight back against the rising profit share of the rich and there will be a political backlash against the rising wealth of the rich."

Plutonomy and the discussion about inequality 

Eight years after Kapur and his team developed and published their plutonomy thesis, the French economist Thomas Piketty achieved worldwide prominence with his book Capital in the Twenty-First Century. In this book, he shows a strong long-term trend toward more concentrated income and wealth. Some economists took issue with this diagnosis. During this discussion, Ajay Kapur the author of the plutonomy-theses, which is closely related to Piketty's theses, entered the public stage again in May 2014. In a paper, which he wrote for customers of his new employer, Bank of America Merrill Lynch, one of the largest wealth management firms, Kapur and his team defended Piketty against critics.

In their study "Piketty and Plutonomy: The Revenge of Inequality" they state that in the long term the drivers of the further concentration of wealth are intact, including globalization and capitalism-friendly governments. However, they warn that in the short-term there is potential for a backlash. One reason is that the US central bank Federal Reserve is reducing their asset purchases. According to Kapur and team, "the balance sheets of the plutonomists have been an important transmission channel of monetary policy."

They further see the luxury industry catering to plutonomists threatened by anti-corruption initiatives of China and India. Firms like Rémy Cointreau are already suffering from this, they write.

Study of Boston Consulting Group on the trend of wealth concentration 

The "Global Wealth Report", which Boston Consulting Group (BCG) published in June 2014 in Washington, D.C., shows that the liquid wealth of the super-rich, the ultra-high-net-worth households (UHNW), has increased by 20% in 2013.

BCG uses a household definition of ultra high-net-worth individual (UHNW) which places only those with more than $100 million liquid financial wealth into the UHNW category, more than the usual $30 million, with which the ultra-category had been created in 2007. According to BCG, about 15,000 households globally belong in this group of the super-rich. They control 5.5% of the global financial wealth. 5,000 of them live in the US, followed by China, Britain, and Germany.

BCG expects the trend toward more concentrated wealth to continue unabated. While the financial wealth of the sub-millionaires is expected to increase by 3.7% annually until 2019, the expected growth rate for the super-rich is 9.1%. The share of this group in global financial wealth would thus increase to 5.5% by 2019.

References

Further reading 
 Kapur, Ajay et al.: "The Plutonomy Symposium – Rising Tides Lifting Yachts", Citigroup, Equity Strategy, The Global Investigator, September 29, 2006.

External links 

 The Wall Street Journal: Plutonomics, January 8, 2007
 Noam Chomsky: Plutonomy and the Precariat, Posted: 05/08/2012
 Edward Fullbrook in Real World Econoomics Review: The political economy of bubbles, Issue 59,2012
 BCG: Global Wealth 2014, Riding a Wave of Growth (Press release)

Economic inequality
Wealth concentration